The John Alexander Austin House is a historic house in Memphis, Tennessee, U.S.. It was built circa 1876 for John Alexander Austin, a veteran of the Confederate States Army during the American Civil War of 1861–1865, and a clothing retailer. It was designed in the Italianate architectural style. It has been listed on the National Register of Historic Places since July 12, 1984.

References

Houses on the National Register of Historic Places in Tennessee
Italianate architecture in Tennessee
Houses completed in 1876
Houses in Memphis, Tennessee